Jonathan Roberts (born May 10, 1956) is an American screenwriter, television producer and author. He is known for having co-written Disney's The Lion King.

Life and career

Born in Boston, Roberts studied English literature at Brown University and took a summer graduate program on book and magazine publishing at Harvard before launching his career.

His first written work was on The 80s: A Look Back and The Official Preppy Handbook, which became a New York Times bestseller.

Roberts's first screenplay credit was on The Sure Thing in 1985. He later went on to write for Fast Times, in which he also served as producer.

Roberts then joined Disney's story department and worked on the award-winning 1994 animated feature The Lion King with Irene Mecchi and Linda Woolverton.

He also co-wrote the screenplays for James and the Giant Peach and The Hunchback of Notre Dame while at Disney.

Roberts served as producer on Beverly Hills 90210 and Head of the Class.

Filmography

The Sure Thing (with Steven L. Bloom) (1985)
Fast Times (1986) (TV) (also Producer)
Once Bitten (with David Hines and Jeffrey Hause) (1985)
Head of the Class (1989–1990) (TV) (Co-Producer)
Beverly Hills 90210 (1991–1992) (TV) (also Co-Producer)
Homeward Bound: The Incredible Journey (1993) (uncredited writer)
The Lion King (with Irene Mecchi and Linda Woolverton) (1994)
James and the Giant Peach (with Steven L. Bloom and Karey Kirkpatrick) (1996)
The Hunchback of Notre Dame (with Tab Murphy, Irene Mecchi, Bob Tzudiker, and Noni White) (1996)
Jack Frost (with Steven L. Bloom, Mark Steven Johnson and Jeff Cesario) (1998)
Dinosaur (2000) (additional screenplay material)
The Emperor's New Groove (2000) (uncredited writer)
Monsters, Inc. (2001) (additional screenplay material)

Bibliography
The 80s: A Look Back at the Tumultuous Decade 1980–1989 (1979)
The Official Preppy Handbook (1980)
How to California (1984)

References

External links

Living people
1956 births
Writers from Boston
Brown University alumni
American non-fiction writers
American male screenwriters
Animation screenwriters
Film producers from Massachusetts
American male non-fiction writers
Screenwriters from Massachusetts
Walt Disney Animation Studios people